Arthur Cornelius Spoelstra (September 11, 1932 – April 9, 2008) was an American basketball player.  A 6'9" center from Grand Rapids, Michigan, Spoelstra played college basketball at Western Kentucky.  After graduating from WKU, he was drafted by the Rochester Royals in the 1954 NBA draft (fourth round, 34th pick overall).  He played four seasons in the NBA for the Royals, Minneapolis Lakers and New York Knicks.  He averaged 7.2 points and 4.6 rebounds per game for his career.

Following his basketball career, Spoelstra worked in the insurance industry and the theatre.  He died on April 9, 2008 in Evansville, Indiana.

References

1932 births
2008 deaths
American men's basketball players
Basketball players from Grand Rapids, Michigan
Centers (basketball)
Minneapolis Lakers players
New York Knicks players
Rochester Royals draft picks
Rochester Royals players
Western Kentucky Hilltoppers basketball players